This is a list of incidents when the wrong national anthems were played, sung or performed.

List

See also
List of national anthems
List of former national anthems
List of regional anthems

References

Lists of anthems